The Stairs Without End (French: L'escalier sans fin) is a 1943 French drama film directed by Georges Lacombe and starring Pierre Fresnay, Madeleine Renaud and Suzy Carrier.

The film's art direction was by Jean Douarinou.

Cast

References

Bibliography 
 Aitken, Ian. The Concise Routledge Encyclopedia of the Documentary Film. Routledge, 2013.

External links 
 

1943 films
French drama films
1940s French-language films
Films directed by Georges Lacombe
French black-and-white films
1943 drama films
1940s French films